The title Leader of the Labour Party may refer to:
Leader of the Labour Party (Ireland)
Leader of the Labour Party (Netherlands)
Leader of the Labour Party (UK)
Leader of the Scottish Labour Party
Leader of the New Zealand Labour Party

See also
Leaders of the Australian Labor Party
Deputy Leader of the Labour Party (UK)
Labour Party (disambiguation)
Labour Party leadership election (disambiguation)